The fifth season of Finnish Idol premiered on February 3, 2011 on MTV3. Nina Tapio and Jone Nikula returned as judges, and Sami Pitkämö replaced Patric Sarin as a judge.  Heikki Paasonen returned as the show's host, but his co-hosts from the previous season did not return as they were replaced by Niina Herala.

Idols tekee hyvää, a Finnish version of the hugely acclaimed American Idol Gives Back program, was held for the first time on April 24, 2011. The concert was hosted by Heikki Paasonen and Idols' original hostess Ellen Jokikunnas, who replaced Niina Herala for that one episode.

This season also includes a new show called Idols Studio, which replaces Idols Extra. Hosted by Idols Extra's earlier host Janne Kataja, the show includes conversations with varying guests. The show is aired on Saturday evenings at 7:30 pm (earlier 6:30 pm) EET on MTV3.

Regional auditions

Elimination Chart
There were twelve semifinalists, six females and males.

Lassi Valtonen was selected as one of the semi-finalists, but he decided to withdraw. He was replaced by a new competitor (Vilikasper Kanth), which was selected 10 March 2011.

References

External links
Official MTV3 site for Idols

2011 in Finnish music
Idols (Finnish TV series)
2011 Finnish television seasons